Maria Spyridaki, born and raised on the island of Crete, is a Greek fashion model, actress and television presenter.  In 2004 she won the title Miss Hellas at the Miss Star Hellas pageant and went on to represent Greece at the Miss World pageant.

News
In 2004, Maria co-hosted the Greek junior selection for the Junior Eurovision Song Contest 2005 which was held in Belgium.

External links
Maria Spiridaki IMDb Full Bio
Maria Spiridaki Videos

Greek female models
Living people
Models from Crete
1984 births
Miss World 2004 delegates
Greek beauty pageant winners
People from Heraklion
Actresses from Crete